Anhelina Lysak is a freestyle wrestler. She represented Ukraine until 2020 and she represents Poland as of April 2021. She won one of the bronze medals in the 57kg event at the 2022 World Wrestling Championships held in Belgrade, Serbia. She is a two-time medalist at the European Wrestling Championships.

Career 

She competed in the women's freestyle 60 kg event at the 2016 World Wrestling Championships held in Budapest, Hungary without winning a medal. In 2019, she competed in the 59 kg event at the World Wrestling Championships where she lost her bronze medal match against Baatarjavyn Shoovdor of Mongolia.

At the 2019 World U23 Wrestling Championship held in Budapest, Hungary, she won one of the bronze medals in the 59 kg event. At the 2020 European Wrestling Championships held in Rome, Italy, she won one of the bronze medals in the women's 59 kg event.

In 2021, she won the silver medal in the 57 kg event at the European Wrestling Championships held in Warsaw, Poland. She won one of the bronze medals in her event at the 2021 European U23 Wrestling Championship held in Skopje, North Macedonia. In June 2021, she won the gold medal in her event at the Poland Open held in Warsaw, Poland. At the 2021 U23 World Wrestling Championships held in Belgrade, Serbia, she won the gold medal in the 59 kg event.

In 2022, she lost her bronze medal match in the 57 kg event at the Yasar Dogu Tournament held in Istanbul, Turkey. She also lost her bronze medal match in the 57 kg event at the 2022 European Wrestling Championships held in Budapest, Hungary. She won one of the bronze medals in the 57kg event at the 2022 World Wrestling Championships held in Belgrade, Serbia.

Achievements

References

External links 
 

Living people
Year of birth missing (living people)
Place of birth missing (living people)
Ukrainian female sport wrestlers
Polish female sport wrestlers
European Wrestling Championships medalists
World Wrestling Championships medalists
21st-century Ukrainian women
21st-century Polish women